North Point (or North Pointe) is a neighborhood of St. Louis, Missouri, US.  It is bounded by Goodfellow on the North, Northcrest, West Florissant on the Southwest, and Riverview Boulevard on the East and Northeast.

Education
 Herzog Elementary School
 Lot a Luv
 New Northside Child Development Center
 Northwest Middle School
 Hilltop Child Development Center

Churches
 Mizpah Lutheran Church
 North Park United Methodist Church

Demographics

In 2020 North Pointe's racial makeup was 95.3% Black, 1.6% White, 0.1% American Indian, 2.5% Two or More Races, and 0.4% Some Other Race. 0.8% of the population was of Latino origin.

References

Neighborhoods in St. Louis